Lemon (Chinese: 柠檬) is a 2013 Chinese romantic comedy film directed by Jiarui Zhang.

Cast
 Hong So-hee
 Leon Jay Williams

References

Chinese romantic comedy films
2013 romantic comedy films
2013 films